Phospholipase C (EC 3.1.4.3, lipophosphodiesterase I, Clostridium welchii α-toxin, Clostridium oedematiens β- and γ-toxins, lipophosphodiesterase C, phosphatidase C, heat-labile hemolysin, α-toxin) is an enzyme with systematic name phosphatidylcholine cholinephosphohydrolase. This enzyme catalyses the following chemical reaction

 a phosphatidylcholine + H2O  1,2-diacyl-sn-glycerol + phosphocholine

The bacterial enzyme is a zinc protein. It also acts on sphingomyelin and phosphatidylinositol.

References

External links 
 

EC 3.1.4